The 88th Fighter-Bomber Aviation Regiment (Serbo-Croatian: 88. lovačko-bombarderski avijacijski puk / 88. ловачко-бомбардерски авијацијски пук) was a Yugoslavian aviation regiment established in 1947 as 43rd Bomber Aviation Regiment (Serbo-Croatian: 43. vazduhoplovni bombarderski puk / 43. ваздухопловни бомбардерски пук).

History

43rd Bomber Aviation Regiment
The 43rd Bomber Aviation Regimen was formed on 3 November 1947 at Sombor with former Bulgarian Air Force Soviet made Petlyakov Pe-2 bombers. It was part of 4th Aviation Bomber Division.

By 1948 this regiment was renamed like all other units of Yugoslav Army, so it became the 88th Bomber Aviation Regiment.

The commander of regiment was Drago Krivokapić and commissar was Živko Ranisavljević.

88th Regiment
The 88th Bomber Aviation Regiment was based at Sombor airfield until 1949, when it was dislocated to Velika Gorica/Pleso  airport. By year 1959 it has moved to Batajnica Air Base. It was armed with Soviet Pe-2 bombers until 1952 when they were replaced with British made Mosquito Mk 6. Mosquitos were replaced with domestic Ikarus S-49C fighters by year 1957.

By the 1961 and application of the "Drvar" reorganization for the Air Force, new type designation system is used to identify squadrons, so the two squadrons of 103rd Reconnaissance Aviation Regiment have become 235th and 236th Fighter-Bomber Aviation Squadron.

It was disbanded by the 1964 year at Batajnica. Its 236th Fighter-Bomber Aviation Squadron was also disbanded, while the 235th Fighter-Bomber Aviation Squadron has been independent in the 1st Air Corps and later attached to 98th Aviation Brigade.

The commanders of regiment were Mića Marijanović, Spasen Zarevski, Miljenko Lipovščak, Ante Sardelić, Nikola Žutić, Tomaš Samardžić, Stojan Mutić, Borivoje Petkov and Stevan Leka.

Assignments
4th Aviation Bomber Division (1947-1948)
32nd Aviation Division (1948-1959)
1st Air Command (1959–1964)

Previous designations
43rd Bomber Aviation Regiment (1947-1948)
88th Bomber Aviation Regiment (1948-1957)
88th Fighter Aviation Regiment (1957-1960)
88th Fighter-Bomber Aviation Regiment (1960-1964)

Organization

1961-1964
88th Fighter-Bomber Aviation Regiment
235th Fighter-Bomber Aviation Squadron
236th Fighter-Bomber Aviation Squadron

Bases stationed
Sombor (1947-1949)
Velika Gorica/Pleso (1949-1959)
Batajnica (1959-1964)

Commanding officers

Equipment
Petlyakov Pe-2 (1947–1952)
de Havilland Mosquito Mk 6 (1952–1957)
Ikarus S-49C (1957-1959)
F-84G Thunderjet (1959-1964)

References

Regiments of Yugoslav Air Force
Military units and formations established in 1947
Military units and formations disestablished in 1964